A bicep or biceps is a two-headed muscle that lies on the upper arm.

Bicep or BICEP may also refer to:
 Bicep (duo), a duo from Belfast, Northern Ireland
 Bicep (album) (2017)
 BICEP and Keck Array (Background Imaging of Cosmic Extragalactic Polarization)
 Business for Innovative Climate and Energy Policy
 Bicep, a domain-specific language (DSL) that uses declarative syntax

See also 
 Biceps (disambiguation)
 Biceps femoris muscle, a two-part muscle of the thigh